Making a Killing is a 2018 Canadian-American crime-mystery film co-written, co-produced and directed by Devin Hume. The movie starring Mike Starr, Jude Moran, Michael Jai White and Christopher Lloyd was limited release in Los Angeles on August 10, 2018.

Plot
When Arthur and Vincent Herring are asked to keep a collection of rare coins worth a fortune, they plan never return the collection to its owner.

Cast
 Mike Starr as Arthur Herring
 Jude Moran as Vincent Herring
 Michael Jai White as Orlando Hudson
 Christopher Lloyd as Lloyd Mickey
 Alaina Warren Zachary as Mrs. Alarie

Release

Reception
Kimber Myers from the Los Angeles Times called the film "a cheap Nevada Barr knockoff that lacks suspense, or a dusty paperback thriller you'd find at a rest stop." Matthew Pejkovic writing for "Matt's Movie Reviews" gave the film 3 out of 5 stars, stating: "Featuring a dynamic central performance from Michael Jai White, Making a Killing is a true crime story that has the characters and plot that will suck you into its stranger than fiction tale." Rich Cline from the "Shadows on the Wall" gave the movie 4 out of 5 stars and said: "Each of the characters bristles with life, making their conversations edgy and unpredictable. The actors have a great time playing with the detailed characterisations."

References

External links
 
 

Canadian crime drama films
English-language Canadian films
Canadian mystery films
American crime drama films
American mystery films
2010s English-language films
2010s American films
2010s Canadian films